OpenForum Europe (OFE) is a European open source software and open standard not-for-profit think tank.  Its key objective is to contribute to achieve an open and competitive digital ecosystem in Europe. Based in Brussels, it launched its operations in 2002 and currently conducts research on topics such as Open Source, Open standards, Digital Government, public procurement, ⁣ Intellectual Property, cloud computing and Internet policy. Founded by Graham Taylor, Basil Cousins and Robert Blatchford, the current Executive Director is Astor Nummelin Carlberg.

Activities
OFE is a registered interest group with the European Commission and the European Parliament. OFE advises European policymakers and legislators on the merits of openness in computing and provides technical analysis and explanation. OFE promotes open source software, as well as openness more generally, as part of a vision to facilitate open, competitive choice for technology users. 

OFE works closely with the European Commission, European Parliament, national and local governments both directly and via its national partners. It follows five openness objectives to help direct its work : User centricity, Competition, Flexibility, Sustainability, and Community.

Economic Impact of Open Source Software 
In 2021, OFE, in collaboration with Fraunhofer ISI, conducted a study on the impact of open source software and hardware on technological independence, competitiveness, and innovation in Europe for the European Commission.

The EU Open Source Policy Summit 
Started in 2015, OFE organises the EU Open Source Policy Summit . Started as just a few people workshop, its 2022 edition gathered 600 participants and 38 speakers. Topics tackled during the sessions at the Summit included: public sector’s capacity in Open Source, Open Source Software security, Economics of Open Source and supporting the green transition through Open Source solutions.

OpenForum Academy 
OpenForum Academy is an independent programme established by OpenForum Europe with the aim to create a link between academias and policymaker. In order to provide new input and insight into the key issues which impact the openness of the IT market, the programme gathers researchers from various countries.

References

External links
OpenForum Europe

Free and open-source software organizations
Information technology organizations based in Europe
Intellectual property activism
Organizations established in 2002